Rusanovo is a rural locality (a village) and the administrative center of Rusanovskoye Rural Settlement, Ternovsky District, Voronezh Oblast, Russia. The population was 1,415 as of 2010. There are 18 streets.

Geography 
Rusanovo is located 13 km northwest of Ternovka (the district's administrative centre) by road. Polyana is the nearest rural locality.

References 

Rural localities in Ternovsky District